This is a season-by-season list of records compiled by Sacred Heart in men's ice hockey.

Sacred Heart University has yet to make an appearance in the NCAA Tournament.

Season-by-season results

Note: GP = Games played, W = Wins, L = Losses, T = Ties

* Winning percentage is used when conference schedules are unbalanced.† Sacred Heart was ruled ineligible for postseason play and their divisional games were not counted in conference standings as a result of the program offering athletic scholarships.

Footnotes

References

 
Lists of college men's ice hockey seasons in the United States
Sacred Heart Pioneers ice hockey seasons